John Charles Kerin  (born 21 November 1937) is an Australian economist and former Labor Party politician who served in the House of Representatives from 1972 to 1975 and again from 1978 to 1993. He held a number of senior ministerial roles in both the Hawke and Keating Governments, including six months as Treasurer of Australia and eight years as Minister for Primary Industries and Energy, holding the latter role for the longest period in Australian history.

Early life and education
Kerin was born in Bowral in the Southern Highlands of New South Wales. Growing up in a rural area, he was educated at Hurlstone Agricultural High School and Bowral High School. He worked as a poultry farmer before later completing a Bachelor of Arts from the University of New England, Armidale, in 1967, and then a Bachelor of Economics from the Australian National University in 1977. In between studying for his two degrees, Kerin spent time working at the Australian Bureau of Agricultural and Resource Economics (ABARE).

Political career
Having joined the Labor Party as a student, Kerin was elected to the House of Representatives for the seat of Macarthur at the 1972 election. He remained on the backbench throughout the Whitlam Government, but lost his seat in Labor's landslide defeat at the 1975 election, returning to work at the ABARE. He was later selected as Labor's candidate for the safe seat of Werriwa at the 1978 by-election caused by the retirement of former Prime Minister Gough Whitlam, who had held the seat since 1952.

After Labor's landslide victory at the 1983 election, newly elected Prime Minister Bob Hawke appointed Kerin as Minister for Primary Industries and Energy owing to Kerin's significant experience both in economics and working on commodities and agricultural policies. His background made Kerin a good fit for the role, and he remained in the position for almost the entirety of Hawke's time as Prime Minister, making him by far the longest-serving minister in this portfolio in Australian history. During his time as Primary Industries and Energy Minister, Kerin played a key role in the Hawke Government's numerous economic reforms, particularly the gradual abolition of most tariff protections on agricultural imports.

After Paul Keating resigned as Treasurer of Australia in June 1991 to mount an unsuccessful leadership challenge to Hawke, Kerin was appointed to replace him. Keating had been an influential and long-serving Treasurer, as well as being Hawke's primary political partner, leading to significant and immediate media pressure on Kerin to see how he would compare. Kerin was highly regarded as Minister for Primary Industry After an initially positive start, Kerin was judged by several journalists as failing to respond adequately to the Liberal-National Coalition's proposals for their new 'Fightback!' economic policy. Kerin was further undermined by hostile briefing by some from within the Labor Caucus, and ultimately his authority in office was fatally undermined when he made a public gaffe by appearing to forget the meaning of a gross operating surplus. Hawke felt that he had no option but to sack Kerin as Treasurer, replacing him with Ralph Willis, and instead appointing Kerin as Minister for Transport and Communications.

However, his time in this role would be brief, as Keating mounted a successful challenge to Hawke's leadership less than a fortnight later. Having promised the portfolio of Transport and Communications to his close ally Graham Richardson, Keating moved Kerin to the role of Minister for Trade and Overseas Development. In this position, Kerin played a key role in preparing the groundwork for the APEC Leaders' Summit at which the Bogor Declaration would be declared, pledging significant movement towards free trade amongst Pacific economies. 
He was dropped from the ministry after the 1993 election and at the end of that year Kerin announced his retirement from Parliament, stating that he wished to move on to other things.

Post-political career
After his retirement from politics in 1993, Kerin was appointed to a senior position at the Australian Meat and Livestock Corporation, and joined numerous boards of various charities and companies. Kerin remained active across a range of public policy issues in Australia. In October 2008 he was appointed to the board of the Commonwealth Scientific and Industrial Research Organisation. He was appointed the 2008 Distinguished Life Member of the Australian Agriculture and Resource Economics Society.

In October 2010 he was appointed Chair of the Crawford Fund, a position he held until early 2017. The Crawford Fund aims to increase Australia's engagement in international agricultural research, development and education. In 2011 he resigned from the New South Wales branch of the Labor Party in protest at what he saw as the increasingly highly centralised nature of control over the operations of the organisation.  He said that the administrative arm of the party had become increasingly involved in policy formulation, leaving little room for meaningful participation by rank and file party members. In August 2012, he rejoined the Party as a member in Canberra, where he stated he felt that local management of the party was more responsive to the concerns of members.

In 2017, Kerin released a memoir of his experiences as Primary Industries and Energy Minister between 1983 and 1991.

References

External links
 John Kerin (2003), "Primary Industry Policy", in Susan Ryan and Troy Bramston (Eds.), The Hawke Government: A Critical Perspective, Pluto Press, .
 John Kerin (2013), "Primary Industry Policy", in Troy Bramston (ed.), The Whitlam Legacy, The Federation Press, Annandale, NSW.   (hbk)
 John C. Kerin (2017), " The way I saw it; the way it was: the making of national agricultural and natural resource management policy".  Melbourne: Analysis and Policy Observation.  doi: 10.4225/50/590fe72f12dd9

1937 births
Living people
Australian Labor Party members of the Parliament of Australia
Members of the Australian House of Representatives for Macarthur
Members of the Australian House of Representatives for Werriwa
Members of the Australian House of Representatives
Treasurers of Australia
Members of the Order of Australia
Officers of the Order of Australia
Members of the Cabinet of Australia
20th-century Australian politicians
Government ministers of Australia
Fellows of the Australian Academy of Technological Sciences and Engineering